Robin Wagner (born 8 February 1993) is a Czech professional racing cyclist. He rode at the 2015 UCI Track Cycling World Championships.

References

External links 

 

1993 births
Living people
Czech male cyclists
People from Zábřeh
Cyclists at the 2019 European Games
European Games competitors for the Czech Republic
Sportspeople from the Olomouc Region